My Year Without Sex is an Australian drama film written and directed by Sarah Watt, opening the 2009 Adelaide Film Festival and given wider release in May 2009. Set in Altona (suburban Melbourne), it is about a 30-something couple, Ross and Natalie, and their children Ruby and Louis, after Natalie suffers a ruptured brain aneurysm and is advised not to have sex for 12 months.

Watt has said that after her first film Look Both Ways, she wanted to make a film "without a sex scene":

My Year Without Sex received strongly favourable reviews, and was touted by The Sydney Morning Herald as "possibly the best" Australian film of 2009, as well as "the most accomplished" local film of 2009 by The Age.

As with Look Both Ways, My Year Without Sex deals with the impact that serious illness has on individuals and relationships. The two films are reportedly part of a "proposed trilogy". This film was the last film by Sarah Watt, about two years before she died of bone and breast cancer.

Box office
My Year Without Sex grossed $1,125,871 at the box office in Australia.

See also
 Cinema of Australia
 List of Australian films

References

External links
 
 
 2009 Edinburgh Film Festival: My Year Without Sex

2009 films
2009 drama films
Australian drama films
Films set in Melbourne
Films shot in Melbourne
2000s English-language films
English-language drama films